Ping Tom (April 15, 1935 – July 7, 1995) (pinyin: Tán Jìpíng) was an American businessperson and civic leader in Chicago. Ping Tom Memorial Park is dedicated to him.

Early life and education
Mr. Tom was the youngest of eight children.  His mother, Lillian Goo, married Tom Y. Chan after her sister, Mary Goo, Tom Y. Chan's first wife, died from influenza.  Mary Goo had two children: Florence and Grace.  Lillian had six children:  Priscilla, Helene, Eunice, Mary, Tom (Chung) and Ping.

Mr. Tom attended Haines School in Chinatown.  He then won a high-school scholarship to Francis W. Parker School in Chicago.  Mr. Tom won the Parker scholarship over his best friend, Robert Henry Lawrence, Jr., who went on to become the first African-American astronaut.  Mr. Tom graduated from Parker in 1952. Both of his sons, Darryl (Class of 1988) and Curtis (Class of 1990), as well as Trace Lawrence (Class of 1977), Mr. Lawrence's son, also attended Francis W. Parker School.

In an article Mr. Tom wrote for the Parker Weekly in 1988, he stated that his experience at Parker shaped and influenced his life in two ways.  First, Parker's atmosphere of encouragement helped him build self-confidence.  Second, Parker's diversity taught him to develop "mutual respect and caring for those of a different race, ethnicity and religion."  In fact, he noted that he had not known a Jew until he attended Parker.

Mr. Tom then attended Northwestern University where he entered a special six-year dual degree program to obtain a bachelor's degree concurrently with a Juris Doctor from Northwestern University School of Law, receiving his B.A. in Economics in 1956 and his J.D. in 1958.

Businesses

 Chinese Trading Company (est. 1911):  food import company
 Vice president, 1966–72; President, 1972–95
 Chinese Noodle Company (est. 1911): maker of egg noodles and won ton and egg roll skins
 Vice president, 1958–66; President, 1972–95
 Lekel Chop Suey Pail Company: maker of take out food pails
 President, 1980–95
 Mah Chena Corporation: frozen food and appetizers
 President, 1980–95
 Griesbaum Meat Company: tripe processing company
 President, 1980–95

Chinese Trading Company and Chinese Noodle Company were founded by Tom Y. Chan.  The other companies were acquired by the Tom family later.

After his older brother, Chung, died of a heart attack in 1980, Mr. Tom became president of all of the above companies.  His sisters, Helene, Eunice, and Mary also worked for the family business, as did his nephews, Jan Wong (Eunice's son) and Chip Tom (Chung's son).

Civic activities
 Trustee, WTTW-TV Channel 11
 Trustee, Adler Planetarium
 Trustee, The Lincoln Academy of Illinois
 Trustee, Jane Addams' Hull House
 Director, Madison Bank
 Member, Chicago Board of Roosevelt University
 Member, Board of Advisors, Mercy Hospital and Medical Center
 Member, Illinois Development Finance Authority
 Member, South Side Planning Board
 Member, Economic Club of Chicago
 Member, design committee for Harold Washington Library
 Member, Metropolitan Pier and Exposition Authority
 Member, U.S. Federal Judicial Nominations Committee
 Director, Asian American Institute
 Founding president (1983), Chinatown Chamber of Commerce
 Chairman, Chinatown Parking Corporation
 Past president and director, Chinese American Civic Council
 Member, Advisory Board of the Chinese American Service League

Mr. Tom was a leader not only in the Chinese community, but in the broader Asian American community as well.  His beaming smile and calm demeanor endeared him to people of all backgrounds.  Friends say that he had a natural ability to resolve differences among people.  He was one of the thirteen original founders of the Asian American Coalition of Chicago, an organization that annually brings together diverse Asian communities, including Chinese, Indian, Pakistani, Japanese, Korean, Indonesian, Thai, Vietnamese, and Cambodian, among others.

Furthermore, some say that because he was a second generation native English speaker, he had an easier time working with mainstream (non-Asian) organizations and even politicians.  Mr. Tom was an advisor to U.S. Senators (Paul Simon (politician), Carol Moseley-Braun), Illinois governors (James R. Thompson, Jim Edgar), and Chicago mayors (the late Harold Washington and Richard M. Daley).

As president of the Chinese American Development Corporation, founded in 1984, he unfortunately did not have the chance to see the bustling development that it has become. It was his desire to expand Chinatown so that there would be more room for his fellow Chinese to live and work. He was recently recognized as one of Chicago magazine's top 40 Chicago pioneers for his efforts.

Personal life

Ping Tom married Valerie Ching (born September 15, 1934) of Honolulu, Hawaii on October 11, 1958.  They met in Chicago while Mr. Tom was attending law school at Northwestern University and Valerie attended the Gregg Court Reporting School, which was then associated with Northwestern.  They had two children: Darryl Tom (born March 13, 1970) and Curtis Tom (born August 13, 1972). 
Tom was  the uncle of American actress Lauren Tom.

Death and legacy

Following his sudden death in 1995 due to pancreatic cancer, Mr. Tom's wish that a park be built for Chinatown residents came true on October 2, 1999, when the Chicago Park District dedicated the  Ping Tom Memorial Park next to the Chinatown Square in his name.  In 2005, a bust of Mr. Tom was installed in the park to commemorate the 10th anniversary of his death.

The Asian American Coalition of Chicago has since named its highest award, the Pan Asian American award,   in his honor.

References

External links
Ping Tom Memorial Park Advisory Board Page
Ping Tom Memorial Park
Chinatown Chamber of Commerce
Asian American Coalition of Chicago
The Raymond and Jean Lee Chinese-American Museum of Chicago
Haines School
Francis W. Parker School

1935 births
1995 deaths
American businesspeople in shipping
American chief executives
American food industry business executives
American manufacturing businesspeople
American newspaper publishers (people)
American people of Chinese descent
Philanthropists from Illinois
Businesspeople from Chicago
Northwestern University alumni
 Francis W. Parker School (Chicago) alumni
Northwestern University Pritzker School of Law alumni